Chailly-en-Bière is a commune in the Seine-et-Marne department in the Île-de-France region in north-central France.

Painters Claude Monet and Frédéric Bazille spent time there together in 1865, and Bazille painted Monet in his work The Improvised Field Hospital.

Demographics
The inhabitants are called Chaillotins.

See also
Communes of the Seine-et-Marne department

References

External links

1999 Land Use, from IAURIF (Institute for Urban Planning and Development of the Paris-Île-de-France région) 
 

Communes of Seine-et-Marne